Harald Oskar Sohlberg (29 November 1869 – 19 June 1935) was a Norwegian Neo-romantic painter.

Biography
Sohlberg attended the Royal School of Art and Design of Christiania. He later trained under the graphic artist and painter Johan Nordhagen.  Sohlberg attended the art school of Kristian Zahrtmann.  He also studied as a pupil of Erik Werenskiold,  Eilif Peterssen and Harriet Backer.

He is particularly known for his depictions of the mountains of Rondane and the town of Røros. Perhaps his most widely recognized paintings, in several variations, is Winter's Night in Rondane, presently featured at the National Gallery (Nasjonalgalleriet).

Cultural references
His painting Fisherman's Cottage was used as the cover of a book by John Burnside, Scottish writer, called A Summer of Drowning; Sohlberg is mentioned prominently throughout the novel, and one of the sections of this book is called "The Fisherman's House" in obvious homage to the painting.

Another painting, Flower Meadow of the North, was used as the cover of the book Morning Poems by Robert Bly.

Selected works

 Natteglød (1893)  Nasjonalgalleriet, Oslo.
 Sommernatt (1899)   Nasjonalgalleriet, Oslo.
 Vinternatt i fjelene (1901) Hilmar Rekstens Samlinger, Bergen
 Fra Røros (1902)   Nasjonalgalleriet, Oslo.
 Natt (1904)  Trondheim Kunstmuseum, Trondheim
 En blomstereng nordpå (1906) Nasjonalgalleriet, Oslo.
 Eken (1908) Drammen Kunstmuseum
 Vinternatt i Rondane (1911–14)  Nasjonalgalleriet, Oslo.

Gallery

References

Other sources
(In Norwegian)
 Bjerke, Øivind Storm (1991) Harald Sohlberg: Ensomhetens maler (Gyldendal norsk forlag)   
 Bjerke, Øivind Storm (1996) Edvard Munch and Harald Sohlberg: Landscapes of the Mind (National Academy of Design) 
 Lange, Marit Ingeborg,  Peter Norgaard Larsen  (2003) Nordiske Stemninger: Harald Sohlberg. L.A. Ring (Stiftelsen)

External links

 Harald Oskar Sohlberg (paintingstar.com)]
 Harald Sohlberg  (fineart.no)
 Harald Oskar Sohlberg (escapeintolife.com)
  Winter Night in Rondane (Images of Norway: Rondane and Harald Sohlberg)  (exviking.net)

1869 births
1935 deaths
19th-century Norwegian painters
20th-century Norwegian painters
Norwegian male painters
19th-century Norwegian male artists
20th-century Norwegian male artists